Neginshahr (formerly, Nezamabad, also Romanized as Nez̧āmābād) is a city in the Central District of Azadshahr County in Golestan Province, in northern Iran.  As of the 2006 census, its population was 7,639, in 1,765 families.

References

Populated places in Azadshahr County

Cities in Golestan Province